Hirofumi Kudo (born July 3, 1959 in Shibetsu, Hokkaido, Japan) is a Japanese curler, a three-time  (1992, 1996, 1997) and a three-time Japan men's champion (1997, 1998, 1999).

He played for Japan at the 1998 Winter Olympics, where the Japanese team finished in fifth place.

Teams

References

External links

Nagano 1998 - Official Report Vol. 3 (web archive; "Curling" chapter starts at page 236)
Hirofumi Kudo - Curling - Nihon Olympic Iinkai (Japanese Olympic Committee - JOC)

Living people
1959 births
Sportspeople from Hokkaido
Japanese male curlers
Japanese curling champions
Curlers at the 1998 Winter Olympics
Olympic curlers of Japan
20th-century Japanese people